The Communauté de communes du Bocage Gâtinais is a former communauté de communes in the Seine-et-Marne département and in the Île-de-France région of France. It was created in January 2000. It was dissolved in January 2017.

The Communauté de communes comprised the following communes:
Blennes
Chevry-en-Sereine
Diant
Flagy
Montmachoux
Noisy-Rudignon
Thoury-Férottes
Voulx

See also
Communes of the Seine-et-Marne department

References 

Former commune communities of Seine-et-Marne